Nurul Jannah Muner (born 1 June 1995), known professionally as Janna Nick, is a Malaysian actress, singer, host, director and producer. Starting her career in entertainment, she is known for her roles in television films such as Syurga Nur, Kau Aku Kita, Suami Tanpa Cinta and My Coffee Prince. She began her feature film debut with Kimchi Untuk Awak (2017).

In 2016, Nick began her music career with the release of her debut single, "Mungkin Saja", followed by her follow-up single, "Akan Bercinta".

Early life
Nick was born Nurul Jannah binti Muner on 1 June 1995 in Sungai Petani, Kedah, to a family from Malay, Chinese, Pakistani and Thai descent. She is the second child from four siblings and educated in Sijil Pelajaran Malaysia.

Career
Nick began her acting career with 2012 by playing minor and supporting roles in several telemovie and TV dramas. She got her breakthrough role as Nur Jannah in TV3’s primetime drama Syurga Nur paired with Amar Asyraf. She later starred as Iman Firdaus in Kau Aku Kita aired on the same network, pairing with Saharul Ridzwan, which earn her winning Choice Actress category at the 2016 Drama Festival Kuala Lumpur Awards.

Nick also appeared in Siti Nurhaliza's music video "Mikraj Cinta". In 2016, she released her debut single, "Mungkin Saja". In 2017, she made her feature film debut with Kimchi Untuk Awak which starring Aiman Hakim Ridza and Emma Maembong where she played Zara, one of the movie's main antagonist. Also in the same year, she starred with Fattah Amin in My Coffee Prince, a Malaysian remake of the 2007 South Korean television series, The 1st Shop of Coffee Prince. She also released a song titled "Akan Bercinta" which is her second single.

Personal life
In April 2021, Janna Nick revealed to the media that she was diagnosed with bipolar disorder. She also admitted to having attempt to committed suicide twice during her early teens.

Filmography

Film

Telemovie

Television series

Television

Videography

Discography

Single
 "Mungkin Saja" (2016)
 "Akan Bercinta" (2017)
 "Gatal" (2022)
 "Mentari Senja" (2022)

Awards and nominations

References

External links
 

1995 births
Living people
People from Kedah
Malaysian people of Malay descent
Malaysian people of Thai descent
Malaysian people of Chinese descent
Malaysian people of Pakistani descent
Malaysian Muslims
Malaysian film actresses
Malaysian television actresses
21st-century Malaysian women singers
21st-century Malaysian actresses
People with bipolar disorder